Eric Robert Filia (born July 6, 1992), formerly known as Eric Snyder, is an American professional baseball outfielder for the Guerreros de Oaxaca of the Mexican League. He played internationally for the United States national baseball team at the 2020 Olympics.

Amateur career
Filia graduated from Edison High School in Huntington Beach, California. As a freshman, he had a .500 batting average for the baseball team, tying a school record set by Jeff Kent, and set a school record for hits. He enrolled at the University of California, Los Angeles (UCLA), where he played college baseball for the UCLA Bruins. He was a member of the 2013 College World Series champions, and had five runs batted in during the decisive game.

After the 2013 college season, Filia played collegiate summer baseball for the Yarmouth–Dennis Red Sox in Cape Cod Baseball League, and tore the labrum in his right shoulder, causing him to miss the 2014 season. He took a redshirt in 2014, and was suspended for the 2014–15 academic year for plagiarizing a paper. While he was suspended from UCLA, Filia worked as a butler at the Playboy Mansion. He played summer collegiate baseball for the Kenosha Kingfish in the Northwoods League in 2015.

Professional career

Seattle Mariners
The Seattle Mariners selected Filia in the 20th round of the 2016 MLB draft. He played for the Everett AquaSox after signing, and for the Modesto Nuts in 2017. After the 2017 season, the Mariners assigned him to the Arizona Fall League, where he earned the Dernell Stenson Sportsmanship Award. Filia was suspended for 50 games during the 2018 season for his second positive test for a drug of abuse. After his suspension, he joined the Arkansas Travelers, before the Mariners traded Filia to the Boston Red Sox as the player to be named later from the Roenis Elías trade. He failed his physical exam with the Red Sox and was returned to Seattle, with the Red Sox acquiring cash considerations instead.

Before the 2019 season, Filia was suspended for 100 games for his third positive drug test. He played for the Tacoma Rainiers in 2019 after his suspension, but did not play organized baseball in 2020 because of the cancellation of the minor league season due to the COVID-19 pandemic. Filia began the 2021 season with Tacoma.
Filia spent the 2021 season with Triple-A Tacoma. He played in 44 games, hitting .262 with 3 home runs and 15 RBI's. On November 1, 2021, Filia was released by the Mariners.

Guerreros de Oaxaca
After taking the 2022 season off, on January 18, 2023, Filia signed with the Guerreros de Oaxaca of the Mexican League.

International career
Filia played for the United States national baseball team during qualification for baseball at the 2020 Summer Olympics, contested in 2021 in Tokyo. After the team qualified, he was named to the Olympics roster on July 2. The team went on to win silver, falling to Japan in the gold-medal game.

References

External links

1992 births
Living people
Sportspeople from Carlsbad, California
Baseball outfielders
Baseball players at the 2020 Summer Olympics
Baseball players from California
UCLA Bruins baseball players
Everett AquaSox players
Modesto Nuts players
Peoria Javelinas players
Arkansas Travelers players
Tacoma Rainiers players
Yarmouth–Dennis Red Sox players
United States national baseball team players
Olympic baseball players of the United States
Medalists at the 2020 Summer Olympics
Olympic silver medalists for the United States in baseball